The Estonian Independence Party (EIP) was a far-right nationalist political party in Estonia. The small party, founded in 1999, never had any significant success in the elections, and it was dissolved in 2022. One of the principal aims of the party was the withdrawal of Estonia from the European Union.

Philosophy
The EIP's political philosophy promoted a doctrine of “Estonia as a neo-autarkic geopolitical space” and an associated geopolitical imperative of neutrality between the East and the West.

The party programme states that Estonia is extraordinarily rich in natural resources (much of these remain latent) and is situated in an important geopolitical space. Thus, the party is also against Estonia belonging to the European Union, which they accuse of having neocolonised Estonia. The party recommended rejecting International Monetary Fund suggestions. The party regards Setomaa as a part of Estonia and not Russia.

History
The party's predecessor, Estonian Future Party (Tuleviku Eesti Erakond) was founded in 1994. In 1999, it was renamed to Estonian Independence Party.

In 2001, the party called for closer relations with Russia and said that the country should have a bigger say in defining Estonia's future.

EIP took part in the 2003 movement against Estonia joining the European Union.

EIP candidates gained 2,705 votes, amounting to 0.55% of the national vote, in the 2003 parliamentary election.  In the 2007 elections, the party's vote dropped to 1,274 votes, which was 0.2% of the total. In the 2011 elections, the party's vote increased to 2,571 votes, which was 0.4% of the total.

In the 2014 European Parliamentary election, the Estonian Independence Party received 4,158 votes, which was 1.3% of the vote.

In the 2015 parliamentary elections, the party's vote diminished to 1,047 votes, which was 0.2% of the total. The party did not participate in the 2019 parliamentary elections.

In 2022, it was reported that EIP was considering dissolving itself and, soon afterwards, in October 2022, most politicians belonging to then party's leadership joined the Estonian Conservative People's Party instead. The party was officially removed from the business register on 30 October.

Controversies
Opponents have claimed that the party was a far-right organisation. This has been rejected by the party leaders, Sven Sildnik and Tauno Rahnu. One of the former leading members, Risto Teinonen, an ethnic Finn associated with Johan Bäckman, has also been accused of having National Socialist views.

Electoral results

Parliamentary elections

See also
List of political parties in Estonia

References

External links
Official website

Political parties established in 1999
Political parties in Estonia
Nationalist parties in Estonia
Eurosceptic parties in Estonia
1999 establishments in Estonia
Far-right parties in Europe
Right-wing populism in Estonia
Right-wing populist parties